Herle is an English surname. Notable people with the name include:
Charles Herle (1598–1659), English theologian
Christoph Herle (born 1955), German athlete
David Herle, Canadian political consultant
Edward Herle (1617–1695), English politician
Robert de Herle, 14th-century English military commander
Thomas Herle (1622 – c. 1681), English politician
Wilhelm of Herle (fl. 1358–1370), Dutch painter
William Herle (1270–1347), British justice
William Herle (spy) (fl. 1571–1588), pirate and spy

Surnames of English origin